Kustaa Emil Tiitu (10 June 1896, Lapua – 7 July 1990) was a Finnish farmer and politician. He served as Minister of Defence from 17 March 1950 to 17 January 1951 and as Deputy Minister of Transport and Public Works from 2 July to 2 September 1957. Tiitu was a Member of the Parliament of Finland from 1945 to 1958 and again from 1965 to 1970, representing the Agrarian League, which renamed itself the Centre Party in 1965.

References

1896 births
1990 deaths
People from Lapua
People from Vaasa Province (Grand Duchy of Finland)
Centre Party (Finland) politicians
Government ministers of Finland
Members of the Parliament of Finland (1945–48)
Members of the Parliament of Finland (1948–51)
Members of the Parliament of Finland (1951–54)
Members of the Parliament of Finland (1954–58)
Members of the Parliament of Finland (1962–66)
Members of the Parliament of Finland (1966–70)
20th-century Finnish politicians